Software Projects was a computer game development company which was started by Manic Miner developer Matthew Smith, Alan Maton and Colin Roach.  After leaving Bug-Byte as a freelance developer, Smith was able to take the rights to his recently developed Manic Miner game with him, due to an oversight in his freelance contract. Software Projects was then able to market and publish the ZX Spectrum hit game separately from Bug-Byte. Their logo was a Penrose triangle.

Released games
 Anaconda
 Astronut
 BC's Quest for Tires
 Binky
 Crazy Balloon
 Crypt Capers
 Dinky Doo
 Dodo Lair
 Dragon's Lair
 Dragon's Lair Part II - Escape from Singe's Castle
 Ewgeebez
 Fatty Henry
 Galactic Gardener
 Harvey Smith Showjumper
 Hunchback at the Olympics
 Hysteria
 Jet Set Willy
 Jet Set Willy II
 Karls Kavern
 Learning with Leeper
 Ledgeman
 Legion
 Loderunner
 McKensie
 Manic Miner
 Nutcraka
 Ometron
 Orion
 Project Graphics Language
 Push Off
 Run and Plunder
 Space Swarm
 Space Joust
 Star Paws
 The Perils of Willy
 Thrusta
 Tribble Trubble

In 1984 and 1985 they released a number of budget titles at £2.99 on the Software Supersavers label.

References

Defunct video game companies of the United Kingdom
Video game companies established in 1983